Mubarak is an Arabic given name. A variant form is Baraka or Barack, analogous to the Hebrew verb "barakh" , meaning "to kneel, bless", and derived from the concept of kneeling in prayer. The Arabic prefix m- is a passive participle prefix, meaning "who or which is blessed" (baraka). Mubarak is thus the Arabic equivalent of the Latinate name "Benedict" (from Benedictus "blessed" or, literally, "well-spoken").

Etymologically, the name is from the Semitic consonantal root BRK, derivatives of which occur in numerous formulas of politeness in Arabic. The feminine noun barakah means "blessing". In Islam, and specifically within the Sufi tradition, it has a meaning similar to "charisma". The Hebrew cognate is berakhah. In the Quran, the olive tree and the 27th of Ramadan are mubǎrak.

The Biblical name Baruch is the Hebrew cognate of Barack. There is no specific cognate for Mubarak, which includes the Arabic participle prefix mu-.

The name is sometimes written differently; for example, the last name of singer Shakira (a Lebanese-Colombian) is Mebarak.

Given name
Mubarak Awad (born 1943), Palestinian-American psychologist
 Mubarak Begum (1936–2016), Indian film singer
 Mubarak Ali Gilani (1936–2021), Pakistani Sufi
 Mubarak Khan (died 1321), regent of Khilji Dynasty
 Mubarak Mohammed Muntaka (born 1971), Ghanaian politician
 Mubarak bin Mohammed Al Nahyan (1935–2010), Emirati royal and politician
 Mubarak Al-Sabah (1837–1915), ruler of Kuwait
 Mubarak Hassan Shami (born 1980), Kenyan-born Qatari long-distance runner
 Mubarak Shah (Chagatai Khan) (date of birth unknown–1266), Chagatai Khan
 Mubarak Wakaso (born 1990), Ghanaian footballer

Surname
 Ahmad Awad Bin Mubarak (born 1968), Yemeni politician
 Alaa Mubarak (born 1960), Egyptian businessman
 Ali Pasha Mubarak (1823–1893), Egyptian public works and education ministe
 Gamal Mubarak (born 1963), Egyptian politician
 Hosni Mubarak (1928–2020), the former president of Egypt
 Jehan Mubarak (born 1981), American-born Sri Lankan cricketer
 Suzanne Mubarak (born 1941), former first lady of Egypt
 Saba Mubarak (born 1976), Jordanian actress and producer
 Shakira Mebarak, known as Shakira (born 1977), Colombian pop-star of Lebanese origin

See also
 Barak (disambiguation)
 Baraka (disambiguation)
 Barakah

References 

Arabic-language surnames
Arabic masculine given names

de:Mubarak
no:Barack
nn:Barak